Baenopsis baetica is a species of sea slug, an aeolid nudibranch, a marine gastropod mollusc in the family Flabellinopsidae.

Distribution
This species is known only from the Strait of Gibraltar.

References

Flabellinopsidae
Gastropods described in 1984